The Drew County Courthouse is located at 210 South Main Street in Monticello, Arkansas.  The -story Classical Moderne building was designed by Arkansas architect H. Ray Burks and built in 1932.  It is Drew County's fourth courthouse; the first two were wood-frame buildings dating to the 1850s, the third a brick structure built 1870–71.  It is an L-shaped building, built of limestone blocks and topped by a flat tar roof.  It consists of a central block, five bays wide, and symmetrical flanking wings a single bay in width.  The central section has a portico of six Ionic columns, which rise the full three and one half stories, and are topped by a square pediment which reads "Drew County Courthouse" flanked by the date of construction.

The building was listed on the National Register of Historic Places in 1997.

Gallery

See also
National Register of Historic Places listings in Drew County, Arkansas

References

Monticello, Arkansas
Courthouses on the National Register of Historic Places in Arkansas
Art Deco architecture in Arkansas
Government buildings completed in 1932
Buildings and structures in Drew County, Arkansas
County courthouses in Arkansas
National Register of Historic Places in Drew County, Arkansas